Briones may refer to:

People
 Abel Briones Ruiz (born 1973), Mexican business owner and suspected drug lord
 Agustín Briones (born 1988), Argentinian football player
 Ana Briones Alonso (born 1972), Spanish scientist
 Beatriz Briones (born 1999), Mexican sprint kayaker
 Brandon Briones (born 2001), American artistic gymnast
 Cecilia Ansaldo (born 1949), Ecuadorian professor, essayist, and literary critiCecilia Ansaldo was born in Guayaquil in 1949
 David Briones (born 1943), American judge
 Enrique Briones (born 1962), Spanish rower
 Fernando Briones Carmona (1905–1988), Spanish painter
 Félipe Briones (born 1950), Chilean alpine skier
 Heidi Briones, American politician
 Henry Briones, Mexican mixed martial artist
 Ignacio Briones (born 1972), Chilean economist, academic and politician
 Inti Briones (born 1971), Chilean cinematographer
 Isa Briones (born 1999), American actor and singer
 Jon Jon Briones, Filipino-American actor
 Jose Briones (February 10, 1916 – unknown), Filipino lawyer and politician
 José Antonio Lacayo de Briones y Palacios (1679–1756), Spanish politician
 José Luis Briones Briseño (born 1963), Mexican politician
 Juan Ignacio Briones (born 1986), Argentinian football player
 Juana Briones de Miranda (1802–1889)
 Julio Briones (born 1975), Ecuadorian football player
 Leo Rodríguez (baseball) (1929–2011), baseball player
 Leonor Briones (born 1940), Filipino academician, economist, and civil servant
 Luis María Balanzat de Orvay y Briones (1775–1843), Spanish military man, engineer and writer
 Manuel Briones (1893–1957), Filipino judge and politician
 Marcelo Fernan (1927–1999), Filipino politicianr
 Patricia Briones (born 1962), Ecuadorian politician
 Philippe Briones (born 1970), French animator, author and comic book artist
 Ramón Briones Luco (1872–1949), Chilean politician
 Ramón Castroviejo (1904–1987), Spanish-American eye surgeon
 Rosario Briones (born 1953), Mexican gymnast

Places
 Briones, Kalibo, Philippines
 Briones, La Rioja, Spain
 Briones Hills, United States
 Briones Regional Park, United States
 Briones Reservoir, United States
 Briones Sandstone, United States
 Briones Valley, United States